Tom Armstrong is an English professional rugby league footballer who last played for the Toronto Wolfpack in the Betfred Championship. After Being released from the club.

He previously played for amateur side Pilkington Recs, before joining St Helens. Armstrong has also played for Leigh and Swinton and the Widnes Vikings.

début season (2009)
Armstrong's début game for Saints came against Warrington in the first round of Super League XIV. Standing in for New Zealand international Francis Meli, he scored a try in a 26-14 win. He went on from this to play against Huddersfield in the next round, Hull Kingston Rovers and a try scoring performance in a 4-0 win over Crusaders (he was the only player to score in this game)  After a period in the reserves, he came back to play in the win over Harlequins RL where he scored a try in a 44-24 victory.

2010
It took Armstrong 13 rounds to break back into the first-team. At the Magic Weekend, held at Murrayfield, he scored a try from left centre in a 54-0 win over Hull Kingston Rovers, in his first game of the season.

2011
Armstrong was dual registered with Leigh for 2011's Super League XVI. Armstrong scored the winning try in Leigh's 20-16 win over Halifax in the 2011 Northern Rail Cup Final.

2012
Armstrong was released from his contract with St. Helens and has decided to join Swinton ahead of the 2012 season.

References

External links
Toronto Wolfpack profile
Saints Heritage Society profile

1989 births
Living people
Leigh Leopards players
Pilkington Recs players
Rugby league centres
Rugby league second-rows
Rugby league players from St Helens, Merseyside
Rugby league wingers
Sheffield Eagles players
St Helens R.F.C. players
Swinton Lions players
Toronto Wolfpack players